El Espíritu Jíbaro (The Jíbaro Spirit) is an album by trombonist Roswell Rudd and cuatro player Yomo Toro. It was recorded during 2002–2006 at various locations, and was released by Sunnyside Records in 2007 as part of their Soundscape Series. On the album, Rudd and Toro are accompanied by drummer, percussionist Bobby Sanabria and his ensemble Ascensión. Sanabria acted also as co-producer with Verna Gillis and arranger. El Espíritu Jíbaro is a continuation of the cross-cultural experiments that Rudd began pursuing with 2002's Malicool and 2005's Blue Mongol.

Reception

In a review for AllMusic, Scott Yanow wrote: "The rhythm sections... are full of power and effortless polyrhythms, there are occasional vocals, and the personnel and instrumentation change from cut to cut, holding one's interest throughout."

Brent Burton of Jazz Times stated that Rudd's "trombone playing has seldom sounded so good," while Toro "can't help but elevate the setting. He's that good."

The Village Voice's Francis Davis commented: "There are no slavish bows to 'authenticity' here: Though the adjoining 'Preludo' and 'El Amor' are respectively identified as a marcha/danza moderna and a bolero moruno in the liner notes, Rudd's arrangements and baleful solos transform them into dirge-like anthems as stirring as the ones Carla Bley showcased him on in the '70s."

Tom Hull praised Rudd for "just being the great trombonist he's always been."

Track listing

 "Poochie & the Bird" (Roswell Rudd) – 7:34
 "Tango for Chris" (Roswell Rudd) – 6:44
 "Tres, Cuatro" (Yomo Toro) – 8:20
 "Preludio" (Yomo Toro) – 3:52
 "El Amor" (Yomo Toro) – 11:08
 "Bamako" (Roswell Rudd, Verna Gillis) – 4:44
 "Loved by Love" (Roswell Rudd) – 5:46
 "Inspiración" (Yomo Toro) – 5:55
 "Mayor G" (Yomo Toro) – 7:03
 "¡Este Es Yomo Toro!" – 0:35

 Track 1 was recorded at Peter Karl Audio in Brooklyn, New York, on June 18, 2002. Tracks 2, 3 and 5 were recorded at Kaleidoscope Studio in Union City, New Jersey, on May 16–17, 2006. Tracks 4, 6 and 9 were recorded at Systems Two in Brooklyn, New York, on July 23, 2002. Tracks 7, 8 and 10 were recorded at Dangerous Studio on January 16, 2003.

Personnel 
 Roswell Rudd – trombone
 Yomo Toro – cuatro, vocals
 Bobby Sanabria – drums, percussion
 Jay Collins – tenor saxophone, flute
 Peter Brainin – alto saxophone
 Gene Jefferson – alto saxophone, vocals
 Mike Rodriguez – trumpet
 John Walsh – trumpet
 Chris Washburne – trombone
 Alicia Svigal – violin
 Ilmar Gavillan – violin
 Alessandra Belloni – vocals
 Dalia Silva – vocals
 Marciela Serrano – vocals
 Michelle Silva – vocals
 George Cables – piano
 Igor Atalita – piano
 John DiMartino – organ, piano
 Yeissonn Villamar – piano
 Donald "Spider" Nicks – guitar, bass
 Raúl Jaurena – bandoneon
 David Oquendo – tres
 Alex Hernández – acoustic bass
 Andy Eulau – acoustic bass
 Boris Kozlov – acoustic bass
 Jorge Longo – acoustic bass
 Hiram "El Pavo" Remón – percussion, vocals
 Wilson "Chembo" Corniel – conga

See also 
 Jibaro

References

2007 albums
Roswell Rudd albums
Sunnyside Records albums
Latin jazz albums by American artists